The Laird-Turner RT-14 Meteor, also called the Turner TR-14, Ring Free Meteor, PESCO Special, Miss Champion, Turner Special and the Turner Meteor was the winning aircraft of the 1938 and 1939 Thompson Trophy races.

Design and development
The aircraft was commissioned and designed by Roscoe Turner in 1936. The Meteor would be the last of the Matty Laird race planes as well as the last race plane flown by Roscoe Turner.

The aircraft is a conventional geared mid-wing monoplane with a radial engine built in California. It was modified in 1936 by Mattie Laird at the E. M. Laird Airplane Company in Chicago with three-foot longer wings, wing flaps, a longer fuselage and a  fuel tank. In 1938 wheel pants were added for the Oakland races.

Operational history

The aircraft was known by many names. Initially the RT-14 for "Roscoe-Turner 14 cylinder". The air commerce bureau labeled it the Model No. LTR-14, Serial No. 11, Type 1 POLM. The first sponsor was the Ring-Free Oil company, naming the aircraft the Ring-Free Meteor. The 1938 sponsor, Pump Engineering Service Corp renamed the aircraft "The PESCO SPECIAL". In 1939, the Champion Spark Plug Co borrowed the name from its 1931 Pitcairn PCA-2 autogyro, giving the aircraft the name "Miss Champion".

A fire from a leaking fuel tank prevented Turner from racing in the Bendix Trophy race and required the fabric to be recovered before competing.
1938 National Air Races - Turner won the Thompson Trophy Race at 
1938 Oakland Air Race - Second place

The original aircraft was put into storage at Weir Cook Airport for 29 years until it was restored, then donated to the Crawford Auto-Aviation Museum. In December 1972 the plane along with many of Roscoe Turner's trophies were transferred to the Smithsonian. The aircraft retired with less than 30 hours flying time.

The Cook Islands minted a $2 Coin in 2008 featuring the Laird-Turner Meteor LTR-14 as part of its 1930s Air Racing Collection

Variants
 In 2003, Tom Wathen built a replica of the LTR-14, demonstrating it at the 2003 EAA Airventure airshow.

Specifications (Laird-Turner RT-14 Meteor)

See also

References

Meteor
1930s United States sport aircraft
Single-engined tractor aircraft
Racing aircraft
Mid-wing aircraft
Aircraft first flown in 1936